The masked yellowthroat (Geothlypis aequinoctialis) is a New World warbler. It has a number of separate resident breeding populations in South America. The black-lored yellowthroat and southern yellowthroat were formerly considered subspecies.

The breeding habitat is marshes and other wet areas with dense low vegetation.  The masked yellowthroat may also be found in other areas with dense shrub, but is less common in drier habitats. Two white eggs with reddish-brown markings are laid in a lined cup nest low in grass or rank vegetation.

The masked yellowthroat is 13.2 cm long and weighs 13 g. It has yellow-green upperparts, bright yellow underparts, and a mainly black bill.  The adult male has a black facemask, bordered above with a gray band. The female is similar, but lacks the black mask. She is slightly duller, has variable amounts of gray to the head (often virtually none), a yellowish eye ring and a yellowish stripe from the bill to the eye. There are significant racial variations in the male plumage (see Taxonomy).

This species is easily distinguished from wintering common yellowthroat by its uniform yellow underparts, whereas the North American bird has a white belly.

The masked yellowthroat is usually seen in pairs, and does not associate with other species. It is often skulking, but may pop up occasionally, especially to sing. It feeds on insects, including caterpillars, dragonflies, damselflies,
grasshoppers and beetles, and spiders, which are usually captured in dense vegetation. The call is a fast chattering, quite unlike that of other yellowthroat species, and a more typical sharp chip.

References

 New World Warblers by Curson, Quinn and Beadle, 
 Birds of Venezuela by Hilty, 

 A guide to the birds of Costa Rica by Stiles and Skutch 

masked yellowthroat
Birds of South America
masked yellowthroat
masked yellowthroat